Pedro Dolabella (born 29 July 1999) is a Brazilian professional footballer who currently plays for Union Omaha in USL League One.

College career 
Dolabella was born in Brasilia, Brazil. After moving to the United States, he played high school soccer at The Pennington School, where he won a New Jersey Prep A state title. He played collegiate soccer for the Marshall Thundering Herd, scoring 23 goals in 90 appearances across five seasons. He was named the 2019 Conference USA Tournament Offensive MVP after scoring the game-winning goal in the final against Charlotte. He helped lead the team to the 2020 NCAA College Cup, the first NCAA Division I championship in the school's history. His tenure at Marshall lead to him receiving the nickname "The Mayor". Dolabella made the All-Conference USA team twice, and the first team once. In his fifth season, Dolabella was the Conference USA Men's Soccer Player of the Year and Offensive Player of the Year. He was also named to the United Soccer Coaches All-American second team that year.

Dolabella also played for the Flint City Bucks and South Bend Lions FC of USL League Two during this time period.

Club career 

Coming out of college, Dolabella was invited to take part in the MLS College Showcase.

Rochester New York FC 
Dolabella spent time in the preseason with Charlotte FC, however, he did not sign with the club. On 14 March 2022, it was announced that he had joined Rochester New York FC for the club's inaugural season in MLS Next Pro. On 25 March, Dolabella started and played the entire match in a 2–0 loss against St. Louis City SC 2. Dolabella would score his first goal for Rochester on 20 April in a game against FC Motown. On September 23, 2022, Dolabella was named to the MLS Next Pro Best XI. Though Dolabella was contracted to the team for the 2023 MLS Next Pro season, the team ceased operations on March 10, 2022 leaving Dolabella without a club.

Union Omaha 
On March 14, 2023, Union Omaha announced that it had signed Dolabella to a contract for the 2023 USL League One season.

Career statistics

Club 

Notes

Honours

Individual
Marshall Thundering Herd
 2019 All-Conference USA Second Team
 2020 Second Team All-Conference USA
 2021 First Team All-Conference USA
 2021 Conference USA Offensive MVP
 2021 Conference USA Men's Soccer Player of the Year
 2021 Senior CLASS Award Second Team All-American
 2021 United Soccer Coaches Second Team All-American

Rochester New York FC
 2022 MLS Next Pro Best XI

Club
Marshall Thundering Herd
 Conference USA regular season: 2020
 NCAA National Championship: 2020

References

External links 
 Pedro Dolabella at Marshall Thundering Herd
 

1999 births
Living people
Brazilian footballers
Association football midfielders
Marshall Thundering Herd men's soccer players
Rochester New York FC players
Brazilian expatriate sportspeople in the United States
Expatriate soccer players in the United States
Footballers from Brasília
MLS Next Pro players